Dras (also spelt Drass,), also known locally in Shina as Himababs, Hembabs, or Humas, is a town and hill station, near Kargil in the Kargil district of the union territory of Ladakh in India. It is on the NH 1 between Zoji La pass and Kargil. A tourist hub for its high-altitude trekking routes and tourist sites, it is often called "The Gateway to Ladakh". The government's official spelling of the town's name is "Drass".

Etymology 
Traditionally, Dras is known as Hem-babs, which means "snow land"; the word "Hem" means snow. The average temperature of Dras in winter is -20 degrees Celsius.

Geography

Dras is often called "The Gateway to Ladakh". It is at a height of  Dras lies in the centre of the valley of the same name (Dras valley). Dras is 140 km from Srinagar and 63 km from Sonmarg. Kargil town is 58 km from Dras on the national highway NH 1 from Srinagar to Leh.

History

In the princely state of Jammu and Kashmir (1846–1947), Dras was part of the Kargil tehsil of the Ladakh wazarat.

During the invasion by Pakistan in 1947-48, the reinforced Gilgit Scouts, having gone over to Pakistan, attacked the Kargil area on 10 May 1948. The Indian army, by then in charge of defending Kashmir, sent reinforcements. However, they could not reach Dras in time and Dras fell to the Gilgitis on 6 June 1948. Kargil and Skardu also fell in short order. In November 1948, the Indian Army launched Operation Bison, supported by tanks, and retook Dras and Kargil. Skardu, however, remained under the control of Pakistan. The 1949 ceasefire line runs 12 km north of Dras through Point 5353.

The ceasefire line was renamed the Line of Control in the 1972 Simla Agreement, in which India and Pakistan agreed to respect the line without prejudice to their stated positions.

However, in the early months of 1999, Pakistani soldiers masquerading as mujahideen, infiltrated the area and took control of the peaks overlooking Dras and the highway, in particular Tololing, 4 km from Dras, and Tiger Hill, 8 km from Dras. They directed artillery fire at Dras and the highway, leading to the Kargil War. The Indian army cleared the Tololing and Tiger Hill peaks by July 1999.

Climate

Dras is the coldest place in India, experiencing an altitude-influenced Continental Mediterranean climate (Köppen climate classification: Dsb). Winters are cold with average lows around −20 °C (−4 °F), and as low as −23 °C at the height of winter, which lasts from mid-October to mid-May. Summers start in June and go on up till early September, with average temperatures near 23 °C (74 °F) and little precipitation. Annual precipitation is almost entirely concentrated from December to May when Dras gets around  water equivalent of snowfall. There is a popular claim as well various signs/boards showing Dras being second coldest inhabited place in the world. However, there is no reliable weather data to substantiate the claim.

Demographics
The major ethnic groups are the Shina people, who speak the Indo-Aryan language Shina, and the Balti people, whose language, Balti, belongs to the Tibetic group. The local population is 64% male and 36% female. In total the population of Dras per the 2011 Census is 21988. Out of this, 14731 are males while 7257 are females. This block has 2767 kids in the age bracket of 0–6 years. Among them 1417 are boys and 1350 are girls.

Culture 
Many inhabitants of Dras cultivate primary crops like barley. The locals also raise livestock like cattle and ponies.

Common foods in the diet of the people include potatoes, barley, beef, and drinks like tea.

Tourism
Dras has been developed as a tourist destination since 1999, following the Kargil War. This new facet of the local economy initially took the form of visitors specifically arriving to see the war zone. Notable places include:

 Manman Top, 10 km from Dras, from where one can view the Dras Valley and the LOC [Line of Control – see also LOC Kargil])
 Gomchan Valley, 5 km from Dras (a highland valley with glacier and steam running through)
 Dongchik, 10 km from Dras (a model village in terms of agriculture, education and peace. Only village with zero cases as per police record)
 Ningoor Masjid, Bhimbet, 7 km from Dras (a mosque which is thought to have the Allah's special blessings. One wall of which was believed to be raised naturally during construction. This Masjid is visited by Muslim pilgrims)
 Bhimbet Stone, 7 km from Dras (a holy stone for Hindu pilgrims)
 Dras War Memorial, 7 km from Dras (also known as Kargil War Memorial)
 Draupadi Kund – 18 km from Dras
 Minamarg (a valley 30 km from Dras headquarters, hills of which is bounded by the Machoi Glaciers and also is a traditional route to the Amarnath Yatra)
 Matayen (a village 20 km from Dras is the only village of Ladakh with Kashmiri speaking people)
 Laser La (a hill station about 14 km from Dras, especially known for its milkwhite water and Laser La glacier)
 Chorkiat Forest (near the LOC about 20 km from Dras and 5 km from Dongchik, is a natural forest area with a number of wild animals)
 Tiasbu Astana 2 km from Dras (a religious place for Muslims)
 Sando Top/Sando Base 8 km from Dras – Pakistani posts are visible from Sando Top, and Tiger Hill is located in front of Sando Top (1 hour drive away from Dras).
 Mushku Valley 8 km from Dras (popular for various wild flowers during summer season in the deserted Ladakh region)
 Dras-Gurez Trek Route - A trek route from Dras, Ladakh to Gurez, Bandipora in Kashmir which runs through Mushku Valley, Botakul and mountains (vehicular road also links Dras with Gurez)
 Brigade War Gallery 3 km from Dras – information relating to the 1999 war.
Pandrass village 13 km from Dras – border village that was evacuated during the 1999 war.
Tololing Waterfall – it is the only waterfall in the Ladakh Region located 10 km from Dras. It is under the rocky mountains of the Tololing Hill.
Tsochak Lake – located in the Tololing hills about 15 km from Dras. It is located at an altitude of 15,420 ft above the sea level. It is a fresh water lake.
Goshan Valley – it is a green valley about 2 km from Dras. It is believed that the village was founded by a person known as Mon-Choto and his family. After they were forced to leave their home in Chilas, Gilgit Baltistan they are said to have been the first settlers in Drass.
Gangzla Trek – it is a 2 days trek from Dras To Gangzla (which is now known as Tiger Hill) to pay tribute to soldiers who lost their life during 1999 Kargil War. In winter, there is almost 10 ft of snow.
Drass-LaserLa-Saliskote Trek – Three days trek from Dras to Saliskote through laser La top. Laser La is a hill station about 10 km from Dras. There is also a waterfall which can be seen from Drass-Kargil highway.
Amarnath Trek – the trek to Holy Cave of Amarnath starts from Dras, takes almost four to five days and involves crossing a pass of 15,060 ft.
Machoi Glacier – it is located 30 km from Dras. The highest peak named after the glacier is Machoi Peak at an elevation of 17,907 ft. It is a snow covered glacier year-round. Drass river originates from this glacier.
Tiger Hill – it is also known as point 5065. It is one of the highest peaks in the area. It was recaptured by the Indian Army during the 1999 Kargil War between India and Pakistan. 
KBS (Kargil Battle School) –  imparts training to Indian soldiers. After the Kargil War ended, a specialised Kargil Battle School was set up by the Indian Army to train Jawans in mountain climbing and high altitude warfare.
Trongjen Masjid - the masjid is located on the west of  main town (Drass) which is about 2 km away from the Drass nmarket.  About half of the Masjid's walls is believed to have been raised naturally during its construction.
Trongjen Astana. Astana Shareef is about 2 km from main market . 
Churono woy. A water spring which mainly comes out in autumn . It has a different water taste (egg taste). This water is thought to cure for inflammatory diseases such as rheumatoid arthritis.
"Thasgam Valley: is also known as valley of junipers is a small beautiful village situated on the bank of Drass River, surrounded by mountains and glaciers. We can witness two beautiful brooks on each side of the village. This is the only village one can witness Sufi sect of Islam, the village is rich in fauna flora like Himalayan  brown bears, ibexes, Himalayan foxes, wolves junipers, wild tulips and many more varieties. This is one of the best places for trekking, hiking, rafting and camping.

References

Bibliography

External links

 
 Dras
 Kargil area 

Cities and towns in Kargil district
Kargil War
Hill stations in Ladakh
 
Geography of Ladakh